Catherine De Ledesma  (born 20 January 1999) is an English field hockey player who plays as a forward for Loughborough Students and the England and Great Britain national teams.

Club career

Ledesma plays club hockey in the Women's England Hockey League Premier Division for Loughborough Students.

She has previously played for University of Birmingham, Wimbledon and Oxted.

International career
Ledesma has been part of the GB Elite Development Programme (EDP) and England U-21 set-ups for a number of years.
She also captained England U18s.

She made her senior international debut for England against Italy on 6 June 2021, in the EuroHockey Championship 2021 Women. Where she scored on her debut from open play.

References

External links
Profile on England Hockey
Profile on Great Britain Hockey

1999 births
Living people
English female field hockey players
Female field hockey forwards
Wimbledon Hockey Club players
Women's England Hockey League players
Loughborough Students field hockey players